Ana María Gallay (born 16 January 1986) is an Argentine beach volleyball player. She competed at the 2020 Summer Olympics.

Life 
She was born in Nogoyá, Entre Ríos Province, Argentina.

In 2012, she played with Virginia Zonta. The pair participated in the 2012 Summer Olympics tournament and lost their three pool matches. Ana won the gold medal at the 2015 Pan American Games with Georgina Klug. She represented her country at the 2016 Summer Olympics.

References

External links
 
 
 
 
 

1986 births
Living people
Argentine people of French descent
Argentine beach volleyball players
Women's beach volleyball players
Beach volleyball players at the 2012 Summer Olympics
Beach volleyball players at the 2016 Summer Olympics
Olympic beach volleyball players of Argentina
Beach volleyball players at the 2011 Pan American Games
Beach volleyball players at the 2015 Pan American Games
Pan American Games gold medalists for Argentina
Sportspeople from Entre Ríos Province
Pan American Games medalists in volleyball
Beach volleyball players at the 2019 Pan American Games
Medalists at the 2015 Pan American Games
Medalists at the 2019 Pan American Games
Beach volleyball players at the 2020 Summer Olympics